"Invincible" is a song by English rock band Muse, released on 9 April 2007 as the fourth single from their fourth studio album Black Holes & Revelations (2006). Matthew Bellamy has cited David Bowie's "Heroes" as an influence on the song.

The song debuted at number 21 on 15 April, becoming the first single from the album not to debut in the top-twenty of the UK Singles Chart the first week physical formats were available.

Music video
The music video was directed by Jonnie Ross. The video premiered in the United Kingdom on 16 March 2007 at around 11:50pm on Channel 4. It can be seen at the band's official website. The song's length in the video is shorter than the album version but longer than the radio edit, lasting 4:30. It was filmed in Dublin before a concert.

The music video features the band playing through an "It's a Small World"-styled amusement park ride that goes through the events of the history of the world, including prehistoric dinosaur times, Ancient Egypt, Ancient Rome and World War II. There are also allusions to the September 11, 2001 attacks and evolution. The climax involves extraterrestrials with UFOs and giant mouse robots attacking the modern city. Humanity sounds the alarm, and all eras come together to prevail.

Live performances
"Invincible" was performed at almost every show on the Black Holes and Revelations Tour. It has not been performed since 2008.

Track listing

Charts

References

External links 
 Official Muse website

Muse (band) songs
2006 songs
2007 singles
Songs written by Matt Bellamy
Song recordings produced by Rich Costey
Rock ballads
2000s ballads